Charleston High School is a public high school in Charleston, Mississippi, United States.

In addition to Charleston it serves Tippo.

History
In 1999 there was $100,000 spent for a laboratory for biology classes.

The school held its first racially integrated prom in April 2008, which was the subject of the 2008 HBO documentary Prom Night in Mississippi.  The documentary focused on the school and the efforts to have a mixed prom instead of segregated proms, with one for whites and the other for blacks.

In 2010, the graduation rate was 68.8%. The school district is considered to be "at risk of failing" by the No Child Left Behind standards.

References

Public high schools in Mississippi
Schools in Tallahatchie County, Mississippi